Tibor Hufnágel (born 18 March 1991) is a Hungarian sprint canoeist. He competed in the K-2 1000 and K-4 1000 m events at the 2016 Summer Olympics and placed 7th and 11th, respectively.

He originally won a silver medal with Bence Dombvári in the K-2 1000 m event at the 2016 European Championships until Dombvári tested positive for stanozolol.

Hufnágel began paddling aged 10, following his brother. His brother did canoeing, but Hufnágel did not want to kneel, and chose kayaking instead.

References

1991 births
Living people
Hungarian male canoeists
Canoeists at the 2016 Summer Olympics
Olympic canoeists of Hungary
Canoeists from Budapest
21st-century Hungarian people